Oleg Konstantinovich Rudnov (18 November 1948 – 9 January 2015) was a Russian businessman and the head of the Baltic Media Group. Since his death, the company has been owned by his son Sergei. He has been described as a close ally of president Vladimir Putin. As well as Baltic Media Group, he was the owner of Bank Rossiya with Yury Kovalchuk.

References 

1948 births
2015 deaths
Russian mass media owners